Washington High School (WHS) is public high school in Washington, Missouri that is part of the School District of Washington.

History
Washington High School was built in 1900, with its class of 1900–1901 having only five graduates, and 47 students total.

Following the case Brown v. Board of Education, Washington Schools desegregated in 1954 with Clifford Aitch being the first African-American graduate in 1959. Aitch would later teach physical education in the Washington School District as its first African-American teacher.

The new Washington High School was erected in 1956, during the tenure of superintendent CJ Burger who would later name the school’s auditorium, with its first principal being Russel C. Nix. The new school had been in the works for years, and had even received funding from the graduating class of 1949.

Dr. Donald Northington served as superintendent of Washington Schools from 1963 to 1990, and the school’s main lobby is dedicated as “Northington Lobby” in his honor.

Russel C. Nix served as the first principal of the new Washington High School and is the dedicatee of the library and cafeteria addition known as “Nix Cafeteria.”

Demographics
The racial/ethnic breakdown of the 1,348 students enrolled for the 2021–2022 school year was:

 White – 93.7%
 Hispanic – 2.4%
 Multiracial – 1.9%
 Black – 1.0%
 Asian/Pacific islander – 0.7%

The male/female ratio for 2021–2022 was:
 Male – 51.6%
 Female – 48.4%

In addition, 13.7% of the students were eligible for free or reduced lunch.

Activities
For the 2021–2022 school year, the school offered 24 activities approved by the Missouri State High School Activities Association (MSHSAA): baseball, boys and girls basketball, cheer, boys and girls cross country, dance, football, boys and girls golf, orchestra band and vocal music, scholar bowl, boys and girls soccer, softball, boys and girls swimming, boys and girls track and field, girls volleyball, and boys and girls wrestling.

The Washington Blue Jays have won the following state championships:
 Football: 1973
 Scholar bowl: 2017
 Softball: 2021

Student activities:

Student Council
 Gay-Straight Alliance
 Global Community Club
 Spanish Club
 French Club
 German Club
 Book Club
 Creativity Club
 Journalism
 DECA
 Future Farmers of America (FFA)
 Interact Club
 Jay Crew
 Junior Optimist International Club
 Leadership
 Link Crew
 National Honor Society
 Renaissance
 Science Club
 Mu Alpha Theta (ΜΑΘ)
 Football
 Girls and boys swimming
 Softball
 Wrestling
 Soccer
 Basketball
 Cheerleading
 Golf
 Volleyball
 Baseball
 Track
 Cross Country
 Fellowship of Christian Athletes (FCA)
 Pep Band
 Orchestra
 Percussion Ensemble
 Vocal Music
 Key Club
 Theatre Guild
 Swimming
 FIRST Robotics
 Youth and Government Club

Notable alumni
 Rodney "Rocky" Sickmann '76 - author, US Marine Corps, Sergeant, held hostage during the Iran hostage crisis.
 Scott Suggs '08 - professional basketball player, Mr. Show-Me Basketball (2008).

References

External links
 Washington High School
 

High schools in Franklin County, Missouri
Public high schools in Missouri